Bertram Arthur Grenside (9 April 1899 – 2 October 1989) was a New Zealand rugby union player. A winger, Grenside represented  at a provincial level. He was a member of the New Zealand national side, the All Blacks, on the 1928 tour of South Africa and 1929 tour of Australia. On those tours, he played 21 matches for the All Blacks, including six internationals, scoring 42 points in all.

References

1899 births
1989 deaths
Rugby union players from Hastings, New Zealand
New Zealand rugby union players
New Zealand international rugby union players
Hawke's Bay rugby union players
Rugby union wings